"If You" is a song recorded by South Korean boy band Big Bang. It was released digitally on July 1, 2015 by YG Entertainment, as the third single from Made, being included in the single album D. It was written by group member G-Dragon who also produced the song with P.K and Dee.P. "If You" became a chart-topper in South Korea's Gaon Digital Chart, and went on to sell over five million digital units across Asia.

Background 
The first poster of D was released on June 26, 2015, announcing "If You" and its release date as July 1. The release was supported by a live countdown on Naver Starcast on June 30.

It was announced that the song will have no music video, unlike the other singles that BigBang released that year. An official from their label, YG, revealed to Star News that "the reason why it does not have a music video is because since Big Bang's debut in 2006, 'If You' is their saddest song ever. 'If You' is a track that will touch you emotionally. A music video wasn't shot so that you can focus on the music and lyrics only." This is the first song in which all of the members of BigBang sing, as typically before T.O.P and G-Dragon would rap.

Critical reception 
Billboard felt that "If You" was one of the group's "most instantly striking pieces in years." Korean website Osen called it "the saddest song ever in Big Bang's history." G-Dragon received good reviews for his writing, being praised for showing "his formidible  songwriting chops, evoking the complexity of "Lies" or "Haru Haru."

Commercial performance 
"If You" had 308,120 downloads sold in its first week on the Gaon Chart, the fourth-highest first week sales in 2015, and peaked at number one on the Digital Chart. The song also debuted at number two on the BGM Chart, four on the Streaming Chart with over 4.8 million streams and at number 22 on the Mobile Chart.

"If You" peaked at number two on the Billboards World Digital Songs. Additionally, the single ranked at seventh as the most popular Korean singles of 2015 in Taiwan by music streaming service KKBOX.

Charts

Weekly charts

Monthly charts

Year-end charts

Sales

Accolades

Release history

References

BigBang (South Korean band) songs
2015 singles
2015 songs
Korean-language songs
YG Entertainment singles
Songs written by G-Dragon
Gaon Digital Chart number-one singles